This is the complete list of Pan American medalists in rugby sevens.

Men's

Women's

All-time medal table

References

Rugby
Medalists